Annesley Frederick George Harman (10 November 1864 – 18 June 1895) was a cricketer who played first-class cricket for Canterbury from 1889 to 1894.

Annesley Harman was the third son of Richard James Strachan Harman, a leading Canterbury pioneer. He attended Christ's College, Christchurch, from 1875 to 1883, excelling in sport. When he left school he joined Harman and Stevens, the law firm of which his father was a partner.

For many years he was one of the leading batsmen in Christchurch senior club cricket, but perhaps owing to nerves he was unable to transfer this form to inter-provincial level. His best score in 12 matches for Canterbury was 45, the highest score on either side when Otago beat Canterbury by five wickets in 1891–92. He was sometimes more effective as a bowler, as in his first match for Canterbury when, having not bowled in Wellington's first innings, he took 5 for 43 in the second to help Canterbury to a 39-run victory.

Harman died of pneumonia in June 1895. A stained-glass window in his memory was placed in St Michael's Church in Christchurch in August 1897.

References

External links
 
 Annesley Harman at Cricket Archive

1864 births
1895 deaths
People educated at Christ's College, Christchurch
New Zealand cricketers
Canterbury cricketers
Cricketers from Christchurch
Deaths from pneumonia in New Zealand